KDZA may refer to:

 KUBE (AM), a radio station (1350 AM) licensed to serve Pueblo, Colorado, United States, which held the call sign KDZA from 2008 to 2012 and from 2018 to 2022
 KBPL, a radio station (107.9 FM) licensed to serve Pueblo, Colorado, which held the call sign KDZA-FM from 1993 to 2018
 KDZA-TV, a television station (channel 3) licensed to serve Pueblo, Colorado, which broadcast from 1953 to 1955